Westley Barber (born 19 January 1982) is a British racing driver who was the 2002 British Formula Ford and 1998 French Formula Renault Campus champion.

Career
Barber began racing in the Formula Renault Campus series in France. He won the title with six victories in the ten races across the year. He graduated to French Formula 3 for 1999 and drove for La Filière Elf finishing 4th in the class B series. He was a nominated finalist for the Autosport BRDC Award that year, but lost out to Gary Paffett.

He returned to Britain in 2000, joining Alan Docking Racing for the British Formula 3 season. He would ultimately finish in 14th and a best finish of 6th in the final race at Silverstone. In 2001, he joined British Formula Ford with Haywood Racing and progressed to the Duckhams team for 2002 winning the championship. Of the eighteen races, Barber won eight, including the first seven races of the season. In 2003, Barber moved to the United States to compete in Formula Ford 2000 with Cape Motorsports. He would finish 2nd in the championship behind American racer Jonathan Bomarito.

For 2004, Barber returned to the UK and joined Comtec Racing in Formula Renault UK. He would finish the season in 2nd place, behind future World Endurance Championship victor Mike Conway. He remained with Comtec for 2005 competing in both the French Formula Renault 2.0 series and Formula Renault Eurocup. In France he won one race at Nogaro Circuit. In 2006, he became a full member of the British Racing Drivers Club. Following a number of years away from racing, Barber returned to British Formula Ford in 2008 competing in the 11 race season securing three podiums including a pair of second places at the final round of the season at Brands Hatch.

Racing Record

Career Summary

References

External Links
Westley Barber at driverDB
Westley Barber at Motorsport Magazine

1982_births
Living_people
English_racing_drivers
Sportspeople_from_Hitchin
French_Formula_Three_Championship_drivers
Formula_Ford_drivers
U.S._F2000_National_Championship_drivers
British_Formula_Renault_2.0_drivers
French_Formula_Renault_2.0_drivers
Formula_Renault_Eurocup_drivers
Comtec Racing drivers
Alan Docking Racing drivers
La Filière drivers
Formule Campus Renault Elf drivers